Jesse Reinders (born 23 August 2002) is a Dutch professional footballer who plays for ADO Den Haag.

Personal life
Reinders played for VV Noordwijk until he was 12, where his father Arnold once played in the first team. Reinders continues to be based in Noordwijk.

Career
Reinders signed his first professional contract with ADO Den Haag in July 2021 to keep him with the club for 2 seasons. He made his professional debut for Den Haag on 19 August 2022 against MVV Maastricht in a 3-1 defeat appearing as a second-half substitute for Gregor Breinburg.

References

External links
 

2002 births
Living people
Dutch footballers
Association football midfielders
ADO Den Haag players
Eerste Divisie players